Katherine, Katharine, or Catherine Smith may refer to:

Catharina Smith or Catherine Smith, English novelist and actress
Cat Smith (born 1985), British Labour Party politician
Karen Zerby (born 1946), real name Katherine Smith
Katharine Smith Salisbury (1813–1900), sister to Latter Day Saints founder Joseph Smith
Katherine Smith (Navajo activist) (1918–2017), Navajo activist, cultural educator, and resistor
Katherine Smith (footballer) (born 1998), Australian rules footballer
Katherine Douglas Smith (1878–?), British suffragette

See also
Cath Smith, character in Gavin & Stacey
Kathy Smith (disambiguation)
Kathryn Smith (disambiguation)
Kate Smith (disambiguation)